William Peirce may refer to:

William S. Peirce (United States Army officer) (1864–1923), American general 
William H. Peirce, American civil engineer and metallurgist

See also
 William Pierce (disambiguation)